The 2012 Asian Fencing Championships was held in Wakayama, Japan from 22 April to 27 April 2012.

Medal summary

Men

Women

Medal table

References

Results at FIE

External links
Official Website

Asian Championship
F
Asian Fencing Championships
International fencing competitions hosted by Japan
July 2012 sports events in Japan